St. Petersburg is a major trade gateway, financial and industrial center of Russia specialising in oil and gas trade, shipbuilding yards, aerospace industry, radio and electronics, software and computers; machine building, heavy machinery and transport, including tanks and other military equipment, mining, instrument manufacture, ferrous and nonferrous metallurgy (production of aluminium alloys), chemicals, pharmaceuticals, medical equipment, publishing and printing, food and catering, wholesale and retail, textile and apparel industries, and many other businesses.

10% of the world's power turbines are made here at the LMZ, which built over two thousand turbines for power plants across the world. Major local industries are Admiralty Shipyard, Baltic Shipyard, LOMO, Kirov Plant, Elektrosila, IIzhorskiye Zavody; also registered in St. Petersburg are Gazprom Neft, Sovkomflot, Petersburg Fuel Company and SIBUR among other major Russian and international companies.

St. Petersburg has three large cargo seaports: Bolshoi Port St. Petersburg, Kronstadt, and Lomonosov. International cruise liners are served at the passenger port at Morskoy Vokzal on the west end of the Vasilevsky Island. A complex system of riverports on both banks of the Neva river are interconnected with the system of seaports, thus making St. Petersburg the main link between the Baltic sea and the rest of Russia through the Volga-Baltic Waterway.

The Saint Petersburg Mint (Monetny Dvor), founded in 1724, is one of the largest mints in the world, it mints Russian coins, medals and badges. St. Petersburg is also home to the oldest and largest Russian foundry, Monumentskulptura, which made thousands of sculptures and statues that are now gracing public parks of St. Petersburg, as well as many other cities. Monuments and bronze statues of the Tsars, as well as other important historic figures and dignitaries, and other world-famous monuments, such as the sculptures by Peter Clodt von Jürgensburg, Paolo Troubetzkoy, Pavel Antokolsky, and others, were made here.

Toyota is building a plant in Shuishary, one of the suburbs; General Motors and Nissan have signed deals with the Russian government too. Automotive and parts industry is on the rise here during the last decade. Saint Petersburg is known as a "beer capital" of Russia, due to the supply and quality of local water, contributing over 30% of the domestic production of beer with its five large-scale breweries including Europe's second largest brewery Baltika, Vena (both operated by BBH), Heineken Brewery, Stepan Razin (both by Heineken) and Tinkoff brewery (SUN-InBev). St. Petersburg has the second largest construction industry in Russia, including commercial, housing and road construction.

The federal subject's gross regional product as of 2020 was ₽5.235 trillion (€64 billion), ranked third in Russia, after Moscow and Moscow Oblast.

Transport
The city is a major transport hub. In 1837 the first Russian railroad was built here. Today St. Petersburg is the final destination of Trans-Siberian railroad, and a web of intercity and suburban railways, served by five different railway terminals (Baltiysky, Finlyandsky, Ladozhsky, Moskovsky and Vitebsky), as well as dozens of non-terminal railway stations within the federal subject. Saint Petersburg has international railway connections to Helsinki, Finland, Berlin, Germany, and all former republics of the USSR. Helsinki railroad was built in 1870, 443 km, commutes 3 times a day, about 5.5 h. The railroad Saint Petersburg-Moscow opened in 1851, 651 km, commute to Moscow is 3.5-9 h. Saint Petersburg is also served by the Pulkovo International Airport, and three smaller commercial and cargo airports in the suburbs. There is a regular 24/7 rapid bus transit connection between Pulkovo airport and the city center.

The city is also served by the passenger and cargo seaports in the Neva Bay of the Gulf of Finland, Baltic Sea, the river port higher up Neva, and tens of smaller passenger stations on both banks of the Neva river. It is a terminus of the Volga-Baltic and White Sea-Baltic waterways. In 2004 the first high bridge that doesn't need to be drawn, a 2824 m long Big Obukhovsky Bridge, was opened. Meteor hydrofoils link the city centre to the coastal towns of Kronstadt, Lomonosov, Petergof, Sestroretsk and Zelenogorsk from May through October.

Saint Petersburg has an extensive city-funded network of public transportation (buses, trams, trolleybuses) and several hundred routes served by marshrutkas. Trams in Saint Petersburg used to be the main transportation; in the 1980s, Leningrad had the largest tramway network in the world, but many tramway rail tracks were dismantled in the 2000s. Buses carry up to 3 million passengers daily, serving over 250 urban and a number of suburban bas routes. Saint Petersburg Metro underground rapid transit system was opened in 1955; it now has 5 lines with 64 stations, connecting all five railway terminals, and carrying 2,8 million passengers daily. Metro stations are decorated in marble and bronze. It is the world 12th underground under the number of passengers.

Traffic jams are common in the city, because of narrow  streets, parking sites along their edges, high daily traffic volumes between the commuter boroughs and the city center, intercity traffic, and at times excessive snowing in winter. Five segments of the Saint Petersburg Ring Road were opened between 2002 and 2006, and full ring was finished in August 2011.

Saint Petersburg is part of the important transport corridor linking Scandinavia to Russia and Eastern Europe. The city is a node of the international European routes E18 towards Helsinki, E20 towards Tallinn, E95 towards Pskov, Kyiv and Odessa and E105 towards Petrozavodsk, Murmansk and Kirkenes (north) and towards Moscow and Kharkiv (south).

References